Lisa Jakub (born December 27, 1978) is a Canadian writer, yoga teacher, and former actress. She is best known for her roles as Lydia Hillard in the comedy-drama film Mrs. Doubtfire (1993) and as Alicia Casse in Independence Day (1996).

Childhood and education
Jakub was born on December 27, 1978, in Toronto, Ontario. She is of Slovak (father) and Welsh and Scottish (mother) descent. She attended multiple schools in her early life, including Hillfield Strathallan College. 

Jakub graduated from the University of Virginia with a degree in Sociology in 2010.

Acting
Jakub's first role was as Katis' Granddaughter in the 1985 film Eleni. She appeared in comedy-drama film Mrs. Doubtfire (1993) alongside Mara Wilson, Sally Field, Matthew Lawrence, and Robin Williams. When Jakub received the part of Lydia in Mrs. Doubtfire, her high school expelled her for accruing too many absences. Robin Williams wrote a letter to Jakub's high school, pleading with them to re-admit Jakub but this was unsuccessful.

She played Sandra in Matinee (1993), appeared in A Pig's Tale (1994) and Independence Day (1996), The Beautician and the Beast (1997), and played the "inspiration" for Princess Leia in the short film George Lucas in Love (1999). She starred in Picture Perfect (1995), and portrayed a bordello worker in the American Old West in Painted Angels (1997).

Personal life
After retiring from acting in 2001 at the age of 22, Jakub moved to Virginia and married her longtime best friend, former Hollywood theater manager Jeremy Jones, in 2005. She has publicly stated that she has no plans to return to acting. Jakub later became a writer, authoring two books called You Look Like That Girl (2015) and Not Just Me (2017) and regularly contributes to online blogs. Jakub is also a qualified Kripalu yoga teacher. She has openly discussed her battles with anxiety, depression and panic attacks, which she has suffered from since her teenage years and credits her yoga practice in helping her overcome her battles. In 2021, Lisa launched a new website, BlueMala, which she described as the resource that she wished she had when she was in her darkest moments. The website contains her articles on mental wellness along with her yoga and meditation videos.

Writings
 You Look Like That Girl: A Child Actor Stops Pretending and Finally Grows Up (2015)
 Not Just Me: Anxiety, Depression, and Learning to Embrace Your Weird (2017)
 (Don't) Call Me Crazy (contributing writer) (Algonquin, 2018)

Filmography

Film

Television

References

External links

 Lisa Jakub
 You Look Like That Girl

Lisa Jakub's Blue Mala Website

1978 births
20th-century Canadian actresses
21st-century American writers
Actresses from Toronto
Canadian child actresses
Canadian emigrants to the United States
Canadian film actresses
Canadian people of Scottish descent
Canadian people of Slovak descent
Canadian people of Welsh descent
Canadian television actresses
Canadian women non-fiction writers
Living people
Writers from Toronto
21st-century American women writers